Pulliainen is a Finnish surname. Notable people with the surname include:

 Erkki Pulliainen (born 1938), Finnish biologist and politician
 Vesa Pulliainen (1957–2010), Finnish footballer
 Tuukka Pulliainen (born 1984), Finnish professional ice hockey forward

Finnish-language surnames